The 1987 Individual Speedway World Championship was the 42nd edition of the official World Championship to determine the world champion rider.

It was contested for the one and only time over two days in the Netherlands. The scores from both meetings were combined to produce the eventual winner.

With the chances of a surprise winner reduced due to two races being held it was the favourite Hans Nielsen that duly obliged with his second World crown. Nielsen had trailed after day one by 1 point to great rival Erik Gundersen and the American Sam Ermolenko. However in trademark style Nielsen produced a 15 point maximum on day two to wrap up the World Title, with Gundersen claiming silver and Ermolenko bronze.

British Qualification

British Final
 May 31, 1987
  Coventry, Brandon Stadium
 Top 9 to Commonwealth Final plus 1 reserve

Swedish Qualification

Swedish Final
 May 19, 20 & 21
  Mariestad, Eskilstuna & Vetlanda
 First 4 to Nordic Final plus 1 reserve

Intercontinental Round

Australian Final
 January 24, 1987
 Mildura
First 3 to Commonwealth Final

New Zealand Final
 February 21, 1987
  Auckland
 Marked in green to Commonwealth Final

Danish Final
 May 17, 1987
  Slangerup
 First 6 to the Nordic Final

American Final
 June 13, 1987
  Long Beach, Veterans Memorial Stadium
 First 4 to Overseas Final

Commonwealth Final
 June 14, 1987
  Belle Vue
 First 10 to the Overseas Final

Finnish Final
 August 26, 1987
 Lahti
 First to Nordic Final

Overseas Final
 July 5, 1987
  Bradford
 First 10 to the Intercontinental Final plus 1 reserve

Nordic Final
 June 14, 1987
  Norrköping
 First 7 to the Intercontinental Final plus 1 reserve

Intercontinental Final
 July 27, 1987
  Vojens
 First 11 to the World Final plus 1 reserve

Continental Round

Nederlands Final
 April 20,24, July 4,12
  Feyenoord, Heusden Zolder, Amsterdam & Blijham
 Marked in green to Continental Qualification

German Final
 September 4, 1987
  Pocking
 Marked in green to Continental Qualification

Italian Final
 March 29, April 5 and 24, May 10, July 4
  Treviso, Lonigo, Terenzano, Badia Polesine & Castiglione Olona
 Marked in green to Continental Qualification

Hungarian Final
 Marked in green to Continental Qualification

Сontinental Final
 July 26, 1987
  Lonigo
 First 4 to the World Final plus 1 reserve

World Final

Day 1
 September 5, 1987
  Amsterdam, Olympic Stadium
 Referee:  Roman Cheladze

Day 2
 September 6, 1987
  Amsterdam, Olympic Stadium
 Referee:  Roman Cheladze

Final standings

See also

References

1987
Individual
Individual
Motorsport competitions in the Netherlands
Speedway competitions in the Netherlands